Outbound Love (literally "Unrequited Love in Double Cities"), is a Hong Kong  romantic comedy serial produced by TVB. Filming for this series took place in Hong Kong and Malaysia, with Ruco Chan, Aimee Chan, Rosina Lam and Tony Hung as the main cast.

Synopsis
Travel agency employee, Law Sik Sik (Aimee Chan) travels to Malaysia alone for work but all her plans was disrupted by a "playful" tour guide there, Luk Kung Tsz (Ruco Chan). Both of them thus hold grudges against each other because of this incident. Meanwhile, Sik Sik's boyfriend Ching Zin Bok (Matt Yeung) proposes to her and they held their engagement ceremony back in Hong Kong. When Sik Sik thinks she's the world's most blissful bride, a clip of her boyfriend cheating on her was played during the engagement ceremony. With a broken heart, Sik Sik goes to Malaysia where she meets Kung Zi again at her workplace. From then, both of them developed good feelings for each other. Zin Bok's sister Ching Zin Zan (Lin Xiawei) supports her best friend decision to break up with her brother instead of forgiving him. Under Sik Sik's introduction, Zin Zan gets to know chef Cin Jun (Tony Hung) and starts learning cooking from him. After getting along with Cin Jun for some time, Zin Zan falls for him however Cin Jun only likes Sik Sik. When Cin Jun prepares to profess his love for Sik Sik, Zin Bok comes back to seek Sik Sik's forgiveness with the help of Kung Tsz...

Main Cast
Ruco Chan as Luk Kung Tsz (陸恭梓)
Aimee Chan as Law Sik Sik (羅式適)
Rosina Lam as Ching Chin Chan (程展禛)
Tony Hung as Chin Chun (錢進)

Recurring Cast
Mat Yeung as Nic, Ching Chin Bok (程展博)
Samantha Ko as Wong Kei Ying (黃淇英)
Vivien Yeo as Yvonne, Lau Yam (劉音)
Benz Hui as Tse Wan Fung (謝雲鋒)
Amy Fan as Law Shu Shu (羅書舒)
Willie Wai as Shun Wing (專榮)
Elliot Ngok as Law Wai (羅威)
Elaine Yiu as Hong Yi Kiu (康以蕎)
Law Lok Lam as Sky, Mak Kwai Tin (麥貫天)
Mary Hon as To Wai Sum (杜惠心)
Helen Ma as Lei Lai Sze (李麗詩)
Rachel Kan as Siu Mei Ling (邵美玲)

Viewership ratings

References

External links
Official Website
English synopsis

TVB dramas
Hong Kong television series
2014 Hong Kong television series debuts
2014 Hong Kong television series endings
2010s Hong Kong television series